Woodbastwick is a village and civil parish in the English county of Norfolk. It is located on the River Bure between Cockshoot Broad and Salhouse Broad, within The Broads and close to Bure Marshes NNR (national nature reserve).

The village name relates to bast, a pliable substance found under the bark of the lime tree. Danish and Saxon invaders used bast as a form of binding to tie leggings and other items. As a consequence, Woodbastwick's village sign shows two invaders tying their leggings.

The village contains thatched houses set around a village green, and the church of St Fabian & St Sebastian, also thatched. The Woodforde Broadland Brewery is located in the village and produces cask ales such as Wherry Bitter, Nelson's Revenge, Norfolk Nog and Headcracker.

For the purposes of local government, the parish falls within the district of Broadland. Woodbastwick Hall is the seat of the Cator family.

References

External links

.
Woodbastwick Church and the Broadside Benefice Parishes
Information from Genuki Norfolk on Woodbastwick.
NorfolkCoast.co.uk on Woodbastwick.

Villages in Norfolk
Civil parishes in Norfolk
Broadland